The 2005–06 North West Counties Football League season was the 24th in the history of the North West Counties Football League, a football competition in England. Teams were divided into two divisions: Division One and Division Two.

Division One 

Division One featured two new teams:

 Cammell Laird promoted as champions of Division Two
 Silsden promoted as runners up of Division Two

League table

Division Two 

Division Two featured two new teams:

 F.C. United of Manchester as a new team
 Great Harwood Town relegated from Division One

League table

References

 https://web.archive.org/web/20110701061646/http://www.nwcfl.com/archives/previous-league-tables/2005-06.htm

External links 
 NWCFL Official Site

North West Counties Football League seasons
9